Haramian may refer to:
 Haramian-e Olya
 Haramian-e Sofla